Cauldwell is a civil parish in the South Derbyshire district of Derbyshire, England.  The parish contains four listed buildings that are recorded in the National Heritage List for England.  Of these, one is listed at Grade II*, the middle of the three grades, and the others are at Grade II, the lowest grade.  The parish contains the village of Cauldwell and the surrounding area.  The listed buildings consist of a church, a small country house, and two farmhouses.


Key

Buildings

References

Citations

Sources

 

Lists of listed buildings in Derbyshire